Super G may refer to:

 Super Giant Slalom skiing, abbreviated to Super G
 Commercial names:
 Super G (wireless networking), Atheros' proprietary enhancements to IEEE 802.11g wireless LAN performance
 Super G is also a brand formerly used by Giant Food of Landover, Maryland
 Lockheed L-1049G Super Constellation, a propeller driven airliner often referred to as the "Super G"